The 2010–11 Major Indoor Soccer League season was the third season for the league, and second under the MISL banner. It was the 33rd season of professional Division 1 indoor soccer.

Three new teams, the Omaha Vipers, the Missouri Comets, and the Chicago Riot joined the league prior to the season's beginning.

Standings

Blue indicates bye into the MISL Championship
Green indicates playoff berth clinched

Baltimore was the #1 seed due to head-to-head tiebreaker over Milwaukee (4-2)

Statistics

Top scorers

Top 2pt Goal Scorers

Playoffs
The format for the playoffs is the same as the 2009–10 MISL format. The first place team in the season will get a bye into the finals, while the second and third place teams play a two-game, home-and-home, series, with a third golden goal game taking place at the second place team's home if needed.

Semifinals
Game 1

Game 2

Mini-Game Tie Breaker

Championship

Bracket

Awards

All-League First Team

All-League Second Team

All-Rookie Team

References

External links
 Major Indoor Soccer League

Major Indoor Soccer League
Major Indoor Soccer League (2008–2014) seasons
Maj
Maj